Sensation is a 1931 thriller play by the British writer Charles Bennett.

It ran for 59 performances at the Lyceum Theatre in London's West End. The cast included Eve Gray, Sam Livesey, Roger Livesey, Henry Cass and Edgar Norfolk.

References

Bibliography
 Wearing, J.P. The London Stage 1930-1939: A Calendar of Productions, Performers, and Personnel.  Rowman & Littlefield, 2014.

1931 plays
British plays
Thriller plays
West End plays